The 1987–88 SEC Women's Basketball Season began with practices in October 1987, followed by the start of the 1987–88 NCAA Division I women's basketball season in November. Conference play started in early January 1988 and concluded in March, followed by the 1988 SEC women's basketball tournament in Albany, Georgia.

Preseason

Preseason All-SEC teams

Coaches select 5 players
Players in bold are choices for SEC Player of the Year

Rankings

SEC regular season

Postseason

SEC tournament

Honors and awards

All-SEC awards and teams

References

 
Southeastern Conference women's basketball seasons